Edward John Wycliffe Jackson (born 26 March 1955) is an English former cricketer.

Jackson was born at Kuala Lumpur in British Malaya, and was educated in England at Winchester College, before going up to Pembroke College, Cambridge. While studying at Cambridge, he made his debut in first-class cricket for Cambridge University against Leicestershire at Fenner's in 1974. He played first-class cricket for Cambridge until 1976, making 27 appearances. Playing as an all-rounder, he scored 694 runs in his 27 appearances for Cambridge, at an average of 16.13 and a high score of 63. With his left-arm medium-fast bowling, Jackson took 42 wickets at a bowling average of 50.73. Though largely ineffective with the ball, he did take a five wicket haul against Oxford University in The University Match of 1975, with Jackson finishing with ten wickets in the match and accounting for nearly a quarter of his career first-class wicket tally in the process. Jackson also made a single first-class appearance for a combined Oxford and Cambridge Universities cricket team against the touring West Indians in 1976. In addition to playing first-class cricket while at Cambridge, he also represented the university List A one-day cricket, making four appearances in the 1974 Benson & Hedges Cup, before making two List A appearances for the Combined Universities cricket team in the 1976 Benson & Hedges Cup.

References

External links

1955 births
Living people
Sportspeople from Kuala Lumpur
People educated at Winchester College
Alumni of Pembroke College, Cambridge
English cricketers
Cambridge University cricketers
British Universities cricketers
Oxford and Cambridge Universities cricketers